Bittinger is a surname. Notable people with the surname include:

C. Adam Bittinger (1943–2010), American politician
Charles Bittinger (1879–1970), American artist
Ned Bittinger (born 1951), American portrait painter
René Bittinger (born 1954), French cyclist